Leonard Arben Pllana (born 26 August 1996) is a Kosovan professional footballer who plays as a forward for K League 2 club Jeonnam Dragons.

Club career

Early career
Pllana at the age of six started playing football in Trepça. On 12 January 2014, he joined Division 2 side Grebbestad. Pllana in July 2015 was on trial at Helsingborg U21, where on 21 July, he played in a league match against Häcken U21 after being named in the starting line-up and scored his side's only goal during a 1–3 home defeat.

Dalkurd
On 10 September 2015, Dallku signed a three-year contract with Superettan club Dalkurd and this transfer would become legally effective in January 2016. On 18 April 2016, he made his debut against Sirius after coming on as a substitute at 65th minute in place of Ahmed Awad and scored his side's second goal during a 1–2 away win.

Loan at Norrby
On 15 July 2017, Pllana joined Superettan side Norrby, on a season-long loan. Seven days later, he made his debut in a 0–3 home defeat against Falkenberg after being named in the starting line-up. Fourteen days after debut, Pllana scored his first goal for Norrby in his third appearance for the club in a 3–2 home win over Helsingborg in Superettan.

GAIS
On 7 August 2018, Pllana signed a one-year contract with Superettan club GAIS. Five days later, he made his debut in a 1–1 away draw against his former club Norrby after being named in the starting line-up.

Brage
On 27 November 2019, Pllana signed a one-year contract with Superettan club Brage and this transfer would become legally effective in January 2020. On 22 February 2020, he made his debut with Brage in the 2019–20 Svenska Cupen group stage against Elfsborg after being named in the starting line-up. Seven days after debut, Pllana scored his first goal for Brage in his second appearance for the club in a 3–3 away draw over Örebro in the 2019–20 Svenska Cupen group stage.

Jeonnam Dragons
On 25 January 2022, Pllana signed a two-year contract with K League 2 club Jeonnam Dragons. Jeonnam Dragons reportedly paid a €400,000 transfer fee. On 19 February 2022, he made his debut in a 1–0 away defeat against Anyang after being named in the starting line-up.

International career
On 21 March 2017, Pllana received a call-up from Kosovo U21 for a 2019 UEFA European Under-21 Championship qualification match against Republic of Ireland U21, and made his debut after being named in the starting line-up.

Personal life
Pllana was born in Mitrovica, FR Yugoslavia from Kosovo Albanian parents. His younger brother Bujar Pllana is a footballer who plays as a centre-back.

Career statistics

Club

References

External links

1996 births
Living people
Sportspeople from Mitrovica, Kosovo
Kosovan footballers
Kosovo under-21 international footballers
Kosovan expatriate footballers
Kosovan expatriate sportspeople in Sweden
Kosovan expatriate sportspeople in South Korea
Association football forwards
Division 2 (Swedish football) players
Allsvenskan players
Superettan players
Dalkurd FF players
Norrby IF players
GAIS players
IK Brage players
K League 2 players
Jeonnam Dragons players